Moret-Loing-et-Orvanne is a commune in the Seine-et-Marne department, in the Île-de-France region in north-central France. Moret-sur-Loing is the municipal seat. The municipality was established on 1 January 2016 and consists of the former communes of Épisy, Montarlot and Orvanne. Orvanne was the result of the merger of the communes of Moret-sur-Loing and Écuelles on 1 January 2015. On 1 January 2017, the former commune of Veneux-les-Sablons was merged into Moret-Loing-et-Orvanne.

Population

See also
Communes of the Seine-et-Marne department

References

Moretloingetorvanne

Communes nouvelles of Seine-et-Marne
Populated places established in 2016
2016 establishments in France